The 1998–99 season was Fulham's 101st season in professional football. They played in the Second Division (previously known as the Third Division), achieving promotion to the First Division as champions, with a massive 14-point gap on Second place. The club also reached the fifth round of the FA Cup, where they were beaten by eventual winners Manchester United.

On 17 February 1999, Kevin Keegan was appointed England coach on a part-time basis following the departure of Glenn Hoddle. Keegan then left Craven Cottage at the end of the season to concentrate on his duties as England manager. Fulham replaced Keegan with Paul Bracewell as player-manager.

Players

First-team squad

Final league table

Results

Division 2

Worthington Cup

FA Cup

Auto Windscreens Shield Trophy

References

Notes

External links
Fulham website
Soccerbase - Results archive

Fulham F.C. seasons
Fulham